Ikornnes Church is a parish church of the Church of Norway in Sykkylven Municipality in Møre og Romsdal county, Norway. It is located in the village of Ikornnes. It is the church for the Ikornnes parish which is part of the Nordre Sunnmøre prosti (deanery) in the Diocese of Møre. The white, brick church was built in a rectangular style in 1978 using plans drawn up by the architect Alf Apalseth. The church seats about 350 people. There is no graveyard around this church, parishioners must use the one around the nearby Sykkylven Church. The building was consecrated on 22 January 1978.

See also
List of churches in Møre

References

Sykkylven
Churches in Møre og Romsdal
Rectangular churches in Norway
Brick churches in Norway
20th-century Church of Norway church buildings
Churches completed in 1978
1978 establishments in Norway